The 2014–15 Palestine Cup was the 2014–15 edition of the Palestine Cup. The cup winner qualified for the 2016 AFC Cup.

Quarter-finals

Semi-finals

Final

References

External links
Palestine Football Association

Palestine Cup
Palestine
Cup